The 2011–12 Harvard Crimson men's basketball team represented Harvard University in the Ivy League athletic conference during the 2011–12 NCAA Division I men's basketball season. The team played its home games in Boston, Massachusetts at the Lavietes Pavilion, located across the Charles River from the university's main campus in Cambridge with a capacity of 2,195.  The team was led by fifth-year head coach Tommy Amaker and senior co-captains Keith Wright and Oliver McNally.

Harvard began the season 8–0, the best start by an Ivy League team since  won its first ten games to begin the 1969-70 season. On December 5, 2011, Harvard made its first-ever appearances in the AP Poll and the Coaches' Poll, ranking 25th and 24th, respectively. The season included two wins against teams in the powerhouse Atlantic Coast Conference (ACC).

Harvard set a school record with 26 wins during the season and tied a school record for conference wins with 12. Its 14 non-conference wins also tied an Ivy League record previously held by the 2009-10 Cornell Big Red. The season culminated in an invitation to the 2012 NCAA Division I men's basketball tournament, where Harvard lost in the second round. It was Harvard's first NCAA tournament appearance since 1946 and third consecutive appearance in a postseason tournament. Junior Kyle Casey was a first-team All-Ivy selection, while junior Brandyn Curry and senior Keith Wright earned second-team recognition.

Preseason
Harvard came into the 2011-12 season off of its first Ivy League championship and two school record-setting years in terms of total wins. The 2010–11 team that won the league championship during the 2010–11 Ivy League men's basketball season had no seniors. Ivy League Men's Basketball Player of the Year Keith Wright returned to the team as a senior, as did All-Ivy League juniors Kyle Casey, Brandyn Curry and Christian Webster. Harvard entered the season with a 17-game home winning streak, the 10th-longest in the country. Senior co-captain Oliver McNally entered the season with a 32-shot free throw streak, having finished second in the nation in free throw percentage the previous year.

The upperclassmen on the team came from the first top-25 recruiting class in Ivy League history. Harvard and Wright won numerous preseason honors.  Wright was a preseason John R. Wooden Award Top 50 Watchlist honoree as well as a Lou Henson Preseason All-America team selection. Harvard was selected as the conference preseason favorite for the first time in school history. In addition, Harvard received preseason votes in the AP Poll, marking the fourth straight season it received votes at some point in the year.

The team's schedule included power conference opponents Boston College (ACC), Utah (Pac-12) and Connecticut (Big East) as well as a possible second-round Battle 4 Atlantis match against Florida State (ACC).  Expectations were high for Harvard, and a December 8 contest against Connecticut was the only Ivy League game scheduled for broadcast on ESPN2 during the season.

Schedule

|-
!colspan=9 style="background:#991111; color:#FFFFFF;"| Regular season

  

 

|-
!colspan=9 style="background:#991111; color:#FFFFFF;"| 2012 NCAA Tournament

Rankings

On December 5, 2011, Harvard made its first-ever appearance in either the AP (25th) or Coaches' Poll (24th). That left Brown as the only Ivy League school never to have been ranked in the AP Poll and left only seven Division I schools active since the poll began that have never been ranked in it. Harvard was the first Ivy League team ranked in the Coaches' Poll since the 2009–10 Cornell Big Red and the first Ivy League team ranked in the AP Poll since the 1997–98 Princeton Tigers. By January 2, the team achieved rankings of 22nd in the AP Poll and 21st in the Coaches' Poll. On February 6, the team again attained the ranking of 21st in the Coaches' Poll.

Season
Harvard's season began with a Crimson Madness event on October 15 where the team raised a 2010–11 Ivy League Championship banner and held an intrasquad scrimmage.

Following the victory over MIT, Harvard took part in the 2011 Battle 4 Atlantis Tournament. The team beat Utah 75–47 in the first game of the tournament, its first-ever win against a Pac-12 Conference opponent. On November 25, Harvard faced Florida State, which was then ranked 22nd in the AP poll and 20th in the Coaches' Poll. Harvard won that game 46–41 for the second-ever defeat of a ranked opponent in team history. Harvard then matched up against UCF in the tournament final, winning 59–49. Wright earned Ivy League player of the week for his performance in the Battle 4 Atlantis tournament. McNally extended his free-throw streak to 51 in the Florida State victory,  but his run ended in the final minutes of the UCF game.

The 2008–09 team had previously defeated then-ranked Boston College (17th in the AP Poll and 24th in the Coaches' Poll) for the first win over a ranked team in the program's history, but lost to all ranked opponents in the 2009–10 and 2010-11 seasons. The win against Boston College was the 1000th in school history. The Florida State victory was the school's second over a ranked team in its history and the highest-ranked opponent in the Coaches' Poll that Harvard has ever defeated. Florida State went on to win the 2012 ACC men's basketball tournament.

Harvard began the season 8–0, the best start by an Ivy League team since  won its first ten games to begin the 1969-70 season. Harvard, then ranked 25th in the AP poll and 24th in the Coaches' poll, next faced its most formidable challenge yet: Connectucut, which then had a 7–1 record and was ranked 9th in both polls. Harvard had the better record against common foes, Florida State and UCF (2–0 versus 1–1). Connecticut won the teams' previous meeting at Harry A. Gampel Pavilion in 2009 by a score of 79–73 as the 2009-10 Huskies (then ranked 14th in the AP Poll and 13th in the Coaches' Poll) survived a 30-point, 9-rebound effort by Jeremy Lin. Harvard lost the 2011 meeting 67–53.

Harvard's victory over Boston College was its fourth in a row against the Atlantic Coast Conference team, giving it five consecutive wins overall against ACC teams, including its only two wins against ranked opponents. After rising to 21st in the Coaches' Poll and 22nd in the AP Poll, Fordham upset Harvard 60–54 in January. A 65–35 win over Yale three weeks later was Harvard's widest margin of victory against its Ivy League rival in 183 meetings. Harvard lost its third Ivy League game of the season, falling to Princeton on February 11, but avenged the loss in a home win on February 24. That victory gave Harvard a new school record for single-season wins as well as single-season non-league wins and tied the record for conference game wins. A day after beating Princeton, however, Harvard lost to Penn, snapping a 28-game home winning streak dating to February 20, 2010. Nonetheless, Harvard finished the season with a 26–4 overall record. The team won Ivy League regular-season title and earned its first invitation to the NCAA tournament since 1946. Harvard entered the tournament with a 2–1 record against teams in the field and was seeded 12th in the East Region. Harvard lost in the second round of the tournament to fifth-seeded Vanderbilt on March 15 by a score of 79–70.

Harvard set a school record by selling out 10 of 12 home games at Lavietes Pavilion (the sellouts came in all seven Ivy League matchups, as well as versus MIT, Saint Joseph's, and George Washington). All five of Harvard's starters and 12 total players returned from the previous year's championship team, but freshmen accounted for over 22% of minutes played in the 2011-12 season. By sweeping its four games against Massachusetts rivals, Harvard extended an in-state winning streak to 14 games. The program also defeated teams from a record-setting 11 conferences, plus an independent. Other school records set during the season included best Ivy League start and most road wins, with 12. Harvard's 14 non-conference wins in the regular season tied an Ivy-League record.

Honors

In-season
Each week the Ivy League selected a player of the week and a rookie of the week.

Postseason honors
Kyle Casey and Keith Wright were selected by the U.S. Basketball Writers Association to its 10-man All-District I (ME, VT, NH, RI, MA, CT) team, while Tommy Amaker was named the All-District I Coach of the Year. The National Association of Basketball Coaches announced its Division I All‐District 13 team on March 14, recognizing the nation’s best men’s collegiate basketball student-athletes. Keith Wright was a first-team selection, while Kyle Casey was a second-team selection. Wright was also selected to participate in the NABC 2012 Reese's Division I All-Star Game at the 2012 NCAA Tournament final four.

The following players earned Ivy League postseason recognition:
First Team All-Ivy
Kyle Casey, (Jr., F, Medway, Mass.)
 
Second Team All-Ivy
Brandyn Curry, (Jr., G, Huntersville, N.C.)
Keith Wright, (Sr., F, Suffolk, Va.)

Notes

External links
Harvard Crimson at ESPN.com
Season stats at ESPN.com

Harvard Crimson men's basketball seasons
Harvard
Harvard
Harvard Crimson men's basketball
Harvard Crimson men's basketball
Harvard Crimson men's basketball
Harvard Crimson men's basketball